The Kendawangan mine is a large mine located in Indonesia in the province of West Kalimantan. Kendawangan represents one of the largest bauxite reserve in Indonesia and one of the largest in Asia, having estimated reserves of 42 million tonnes.

See also 
List of mines in Indonesia

References 

Bauxite mines in Indonesia